The following lists events that happened during 1997 in Sri Lanka.

Incumbents
President: Chandrika Kumaratunga
Prime Minister: Sirimavo Bandaranaike
Chief Justice: G. P. S. de Silva

Governors
 Central Province – E. L. Senanayake 
 North Central Province – Maithripala Senanayake 
 North Eastern Province – Gamini Fonseka 
 North Western Province – Hector Arawwawala 
 Sabaragamuwa Province – C. N. Saliya Mathew 
 Southern Province – Neville Kanakeratne 
 Uva Province – Ananda Dassanayake 
 Western Province – K. Vignarajah

Chief Ministers
 Central Province – W. M. P. B. Dissanayake 
 North Central Province – Jayasena Dissanayake 
 North Western Province – Nimal Bandara 
 Sabaragamuwa Province – Jayatilake Podinilame 
 Southern Province – Mahinda Yapa Abeywardena 
 Uva Province – Percy Samaraweera
 Western Province – Susil Premajayanth

Events
 In May 1997, the Sri Lankan Army unleash Operation Jayasikurui, marking the beginning of a long military campaign which would last for another 2 more years.
 On 10 June 1997, the LTTE launch a series of attacks marking the start of the Thandikulam–Omanthai offensive. The towns of Thandikulam and Omanthai fall to the hands of the LTTE, this marks the second significant loss for the Sri Lankan Army

Notes 

a.  Gunaratna, Rohan. (1998). Pg.353, Sri Lanka's Ethnic Crisis and National Security, Colombo: South Asian Network on Conflict Research.

References